Kawazoe (written: 川添) is a Japanese surname. Notable people with the surname include:

Hiroyuki Kawazoe (born 1952), Japanese modern pentathlete

Fictional characters:
, character in the manga series Bamboo Blade

See also
7410 Kawazoe, main-belt asteroid
, train station in Ōdai, Mie Prefecture, Japan

Japanese-language surnames